"Saturday Love" is a song performed by American R&B singers Cherrelle and Alexander O'Neal. The song was written and produced by Jimmy Jam & Terry Lewis and was released in October 1985. It peaked at #2 on the US R&B chart and became a moderate pop hit peaking at #26 on the US Hot 100 in the spring of 1986. It reached #6 on the UK singles chart, and #7 on the Irish Singles Chart. The song appeared on Cherrelle's gold album, High Priority, on Tabu Records and included an extended spoken dialogue introduction skit set in a bar.

In 2007, O'Neal re-recorded the song for his album Alex Loves..., released in February 2008.  This version featured the vocals of Bianca Lindgreen, a long-time friend of O'Neal's. Also in 2008, the special edition EP "Saturday Love - 2008 Remixes" was released, featuring 11 club/house remixes as well as an a cappella version. O'Neal and Cherrelle reunited and performed the song at the 2011 BET Awards and afterwards presented the Best New Artist Award.

The song has been sampled 92 times. This includes both samples and interpolations. Popular songs that sample "Saturday Love" include Junior Jack's "My Feelings," 50 Cent's "I Get It In," Spaceghostpurrp's "Friday," and Charli XCX's "How Can I Not Know What I Need Right Now."

Keke Wyatt version

"Saturday Love" is a song recorded by American R&B singer Keke Wyatt featuring Ruben Studdard taken from her third studio album Unbelievable (2011). Wyatt's version was produced by "J.R." Hutson. The song was released as the lead single on May 24, 2011 worldwide.

Track listing
Digital download

"Saturday Love" – 3:59
"Saturday Love" (Misfitz Remix) – 3:26

Charts

Release history

References

External links

1985 singles
Cherrelle songs
Alexander O'Neal songs
Keke Wyatt songs
Male–female vocal duets
Song recordings produced by Jimmy Jam and Terry Lewis
Songs written by Jimmy Jam and Terry Lewis
1985 songs
Tabu Records singles